Bakkhali is a village within the jurisdiction of the Namkhana police station in the Namkhana CD block in the Kakdwip subdivision of the South 24 Parganas district in the Indian state of West Bengal.

History

Sir Andrew Fraser, Lieutenant Governor of Bengal (1903–1908) in the early twentieth century, is credited with "discovery" of the place. In recognition of his efforts, a part of the town is named Fraserganj. There is a dilapidated house near the beach, which according to the locals was the one in which Fraser used to stay.

Geography

Area overview
Kakdwip subdivision has full rural population. The entire district is situated in the Ganges Delta. The southern part of the delta has numerous channels and islands such as Henry Island, Sagar Island, Frederick Island and Fraserganj Island. The subdivision is a part of the Sundarbans settlements. A comparatively recent country-wide development is the guarding of the coastal areas by special coastal forces. The area attracts large number of tourists – Gangasagar and  Fraserganj-Bakkhali are worth mentioning. Gobardhanpur holds a  promise for the future.

Note: The map alongside presents some of the notable locations in the subdivision. All places marked in the map are linked in the larger full screen map.

Location

Activities
There is a fishing harbour at Frasergunj run by Benfish, a wing of the state government has a presence nearby.

Tourism

Accessibility

Jambudwip and Lothian are two forested islands nearby. The only means of travel to the islands is by crude motorised country boat as there are no jetties in the islands. These islands are also places of tourist attraction nowadays.

Transport
Bakkhali lies on the National Highway 12, approximately 125 km from Kolkata. Namkhana railway station is nearby.

Healthcare
There is a primary health centre at Fraserganj, with ten beds.

References

External links
 BOOK Bakkhali Tour Package With Bakkhali Tourist Lodge

 
 Travel stories published in The Telegraph and The Statesman

Villages in South 24 Parganas district
Beaches of West Bengal
Bay of Bengal
Sundarbans
Tourist attractions in South 24 Parganas district
Islands of India
Populated places in India
Islands of the Bay of Bengal